KB Feronikeli is a professional basketball club based in Glogovac, Kosovo. Its fan club is called Black Tigers.

History
They were created in 2018 and with wild card they got promoted from the Second League to First League where they completed the season on first place and they currently got a place on Kosovo Basketball Superleague.

On November 22, 2019, Tyrone Garland signed with KB Feronikeli. He had 42 points in a game in December.

Arena
The club currently plays in the City sport center , in the center of Glogovac, with a capacity for around 1000 spectators.

Current roster

Depth chart

References

External links
 KB Feronikeli at EuroBasket.com

Basketball teams in Kosovo
Drenas